"Hey Little Tomboy" is a song by American rock band the Beach Boys from their 1978 album M.I.U. Album. Written by Brian Wilson, the song was to be included as a track on Adult/Child before the album was scrapped. It was also issued as the B-side to their single "Peggy Sue".

Background
Early recording sessions for the song were held in August and October 1976. Wilson, describing "Hey Little Tomboy" as a contender for the Love You track list, said: "It's about a little girl who is sort of a rough neck, and this guy convinces her to become a pretty girl, and sure enough she slowly turns into a pretty—she starts shaving her legs and wearing short sticks—puts lipstick on and makeup. So she's a little tomboy. … We're very happy with it."

Reception
Biographer Peter Ames Carlin wrote: "[the song] reveled uncomfortably in an adolescent girl who is putting away her skateboard and baseball mitt in order to get hot and heavy with the swain portrayed by Mike [Love]. … [it] may be the most unsettling moment in the entire recorded history of the Beach Boys." Music critic Jeff Tamarkin wrote that the song "is politically incorrect in every way by modern standards".

Cover versions

 2003 – BMX Bandits with Pearl Fishers

See also
"All Dressed Up for School"
"Smart Girls"

References

The Beach Boys songs
Song recordings produced by Al Jardine
Songs written by Brian Wilson
1978 songs
1978 singles